Timothy J. Muris (born November 18, 1949, in Massillon, Ohio) is an American lawyer and academic who served as Chairman of the Federal Trade Commission (FTC) from 2001 to 2004.

Education and early career 
Muris received his undergraduate education at San Diego State University (SDSU) and studied law at the University of California, Los Angeles, School of Law. After graduating from law school, Muris became a practicing attorney in the field of antitrust law. Muris worked at the FTC during the 1980s. After leaving the FTC in 1985, Muris then served within the Office of Management and Budget (OMB). After leaving the OMB, Muris later became a professor of law at George Mason University's Antonin Scalia Law School.

FTC tenure 
In 2001, Muris was nominated to serve as a chair of the Federal Trade Commission by President George W. Bush. He remained in this position until 2004, when he was succeeded by Deborah Platt Majoras.

As FTC Chairman, Muris created the popular Do Not Call Registry, which prevents telemarketers from making repeated calls to American households. Following his tenure at the FTC, Muris advised John McCain 2008 presidential campaign. His former chief of staff, Christine S. Wilson, was later appointed to the FTC in her own right.

Personal life 
Muris resides in Oakton, Virginia with his wife, Pamela Harmon. Muris has three children.

See also 
 List of former FTC commissioners

References
 George Mason University School of Law biography.
 Kirkland & Ellis LLP biography.

External links

Living people
1949 births
George Mason University School of Law faculty
Federal Trade Commission personnel
People associated with Kirkland & Ellis
George W. Bush administration personnel

University of California, Los Angeles alumni
San Diego State University alumni